Buvika is a village in the municipality of Skaun in Trøndelag county, Norway. Buvika lies along the European route E39, about halfway between the villages of Børsa and Leinstrand. The village of Buvika was the municipal center of the former municipality of Buvik from 1855 until its dissolution in 1965, and this is also where Buvik Church is located.

The western part of the village of Buvika is called Ilhaugen.

References

Skaun
Villages in Trøndelag